Penicillium crystallinum is a species of the genus of Penicillium.

See also
List of Penicillium species

References 

crystallinum
Fungi described in 2014